Lawn Boy may refer to:

 Lawn-Boy, a lawn mower manufactured by Evinrude Company
 Lawn Boy, an album by American band Phish
 Lawn Boy (Evison novel), a book by Jonathan Evison
 Lawn Boy, a book by Gary Paulsen